Eric Clifton Turner (born February 7, 1963) is an American retired professional basketball player. He played college basketball for the  Michigan Wolverines.

Career
A  playmaker out of the University of Michigan, Turner averaged 14.7 points, 2.5 rebounds and 5.0 assists in 85 games from 1981–82 through 1983–84 and was a three-year starter. He was chosen by the Detroit Pistons on the second round of the 1984 NBA Draft as a junior eligible. Turner was a member of the USA team that won the bronze medal in the 1983 World University games in Edmonton, Alberta, Canada.

Turner has never played in the NBA but played with the CBA's Detroit Spirits in 1984–85 and 1985–86 and unsuccessfully tried out with the Houston Rockets in the summer of 1985. In 1984–85, Turner was voted the CBA's Rookie of the year after ranking second in the league in assists and contributing 17.5 points per game in 47 outings. He also suited up for the Staten Island Stallions in the United States Basketball League (USBL) season.

External links
Michigan basketball: All-time best point guards
Former Michigan basketball star
basketball.realgm.com

1963 births
Living people
American expatriate basketball people in the Philippines
American men's basketball players
Basketball players from Indiana
Basketball players from Flint, Michigan
Detroit Pistons draft picks
Detroit Spirits players
Flint Central High School alumni
Great Taste Coffee Makers players
La Crosse Catbirds players
McDonald's High School All-Americans
Michigan Wolverines men's basketball players
Parade High School All-Americans (boys' basketball)
People from Elkhart, Indiana
Philippine Basketball Association imports
Point guards